Kuchh Bheege Alfaaz is an Indian Hindi language romantic drama film directed by Onir. The film stars Geetanjali Thapa and marks the debut of Zain Khan Durrani. The movie is produced by Yoodlee Films, a venture of Saregama. The film was released on 16 February 2018.

Synopsis
Every night at 10, Kolkata tunes into radio to listen to 'Kuchh Bheege Alfaaz' – an episodic series of unrequited love stories hosted by RJ Alfaz who, despite his tremendous following, prefers staying detached and anonymous. Among his many fans is the boisterous Archana (Geetanjali Thapa), a girl working at a creative agency – which designs branded memes. She is leukodermic but lives life to the fullest. They meet; or rather talk, for the first time over a misplaced call when Archana accidentally dials Alfaaz's (Zain Khan Durrani) number, while trying to connect with her latest blind date. Thus begins an interesting relationship between two unlikely characters, one overly compensating, but in denial of her present, and the other buried under a dark secret of his past.

Cast
 Geetanjali Thapa as Archana Pradhan
 Zain Khan Durrani as Alfaaz
 Shray Rai Tiwari as Apu Khandelwal
 Mona Ambegaonkar as Jayashree Pradhan
 Chandreyee Ghosh as Priyanka
 Saheb Bhattacharjee as Partho
 Saurav Das as Tony Baby
 Debopriyo as Naren
 Sahil Agarwal as Kushal
 Soumya Mukherjee as Param
 Shankhu Karmakar as Lady Police
 Udai Shankar as Chaiwala
 Moumita as Receptionist
 Shefali Chauhan as Chhavi
 Barun Chanda as Mr. Sonkar

Soundtrack
This is Onirs first film which doesn't have an original song. There are three old songs "Tum Aa Gaye Ho" (Aandhi), "Ajeeb Daastan Hai Ye" (Dil Apna Aur Preet Parayi) & "Pehla Nasha" (Jo Jeeta Wahi Sikander) which are woven into the narrative.

References

External links

2010s Hindi-language films
Indian romantic drama films
2018 romantic drama films